Hungry Mother Creek is a stream in Howard County in the U.S. state of Missouri.

The headwaters of the stream arise in the northeast corner of Howard County at a small lake just west of Missouri Route A about three miles south of Higbee. The stream flows south-southwest passing under Missouri Route O just west of Bunker Hill. It continues to the south-southwest passing under Missouri Route 124 and on to its confluence with Moniteau Creek west of Sebree.

According to tradition, Hungry Mother Creek was originally called Hunger's Mother Creek, on account of a party of frontiersmen who wintered there.

See also
List of rivers of Missouri

References

Rivers of Howard County, Missouri
Rivers of Missouri